The Ōrākei Local Board is one of the 21 local boards of Auckland Council. It is coterminous with the Ōrākei ward. It was chaired in its first two terms by local politician Desley Simpson following the 2010 and 2013 elections. In the 2016 elections, Simpson stood for and won the Orakei ward councillor seat on Auckland Council. Colin Davis took her place as Chair.

Governance
The board consists of 7 members who were elected in the 2016 local elections.

Demographics

2016 local elections
The board members elected for the 2016-2019 term were:
Troy Churton, C&R - Communities & Residents (15,973 votes)
Kit Parkinson, C&R - Communities & Residents (14,796 votes)
Colin Davis, C&R - Communities & Residents (14,303 votes)
Toni Millar, C&R - Communities & Residents (14,077 votes)
Carmel Claridge, C&R - Communities & Residents (14,021 votes)
David Wong, C&R - Communities & Residents (13,308 votes)
Rosalind Rundle, C&R - Communities & Residents (13,172 votes)

References

External links
 Ōrākei Local Board

Ōrākei Local Board Area
Local boards of the Auckland Region